Tales From Wyoming is the sixth studio album by American punk rock band Teenage Bottlerocket, released on March 31, 2015 through Rise Records. The album was recorded, mixed, and mastered at The Blasting Room, a studio the band frequently works with.

Tales from Wyoming was the final album with drummer Brandon Carlisle, as he died on November 7, 2015.

Track listing

Personnel

Performers
Ray Carlisle – Vocals, guitar
Kody Templeman – Guitar, vocals
Miguel Chen – Bass
Brandon Carlisle – Drums
Sarah Swiatek – Cello on "First Time"

Production
Jason Livermore – Mixing, mastering, production, engineering
Bill Stevenson – Production, engineering
Chris Beeble – Engineering
Andrew Berlin – Engineering
Dawn Wilson – Photography
Sergie Loobkoff – Album cover
Chris Shary – Artwork

References

External links
 

2015 albums
Teenage Bottlerocket albums